Negro Creek may refer to:

Negro Creek (British Columbia), a stream in British Columbia
Negro Creek (Tongue Creek), a stream in Colorado
Negro Creek (Hyco Creek tributary), a stream in Alamance and Caswell Counties, North Carolina
Negro Creek (South Dakota), a stream in South Dakota
Negro Creek (Wyoming), a stream in Wyoming
Negro Creek (Ontario), a stream, road name, and former Black pioneer settlement in Ontario.

See also
Negro Run (disambiguation)